The Iran Job is a documentary directed by Till Schauder and produced by Sara Nodjoumi about Kevin Sheppard, a professional American basketball player, as he plays in Shiraz, Iran for the A.S. Shiraz team (since renamed B.A Shiraz BC) in the Iranian Super League. The documentary was filmed in Iran in the winter of 2008–2009, a few months before the uprising of Iran's Green Movement.

Christiane Amanpour, Gloria Steinem, Maz Jobrani, Karim Sadjadpour, and executive producer Abigail Disney have expressed support for The Iran Job. In December 2011 the film was invited to a private, work-in-progress screening at the Carnegie Endowment for International Peace in Washington, D.C. moderated by Karim Sadjadpour.

On January 9, 2012 The Iran Job completed a 50-day crowdfunding campaign on Kickstarter that raised over $100,000. During its Kickstarter campaign, the film received press coverage from CNN International (on two occasions: a print article on December 23, 2011 and a TV interview that broadcast on January 5, 2012), The Washington Post, The Huffington Post, PBS FRONTLINE's Tehran Bureau, and IFP's Filmmaker magazine. Since the completion of its Kickstarter campaign, the film has received press from PBS' P.O.V. blog.

The Iran Job had its world premiere in the Documentary Competition of the Los Angeles Film Festival in June 2012 and it won the award for best documentary entry at the Arlington International Film Festival, Arlington, Massachusetts, in 2013. It has received positive reviews for its humanity and for successfully mixing genres from sports documentary to commentary about social and political climate in Iran, using Kevin's and his friends point of view.

After the world premiere, the filmmakers launched a 2nd Kickstarter campaign raising $66,105 for the subsequent self-release of the film.

In late 2012, Film Movement acquired the film for North American distribution and as of March, 2014, was available on all digital platforms, including Netflix.

In 2013, The Iran Job was short-listed for the Germany Academy Award.

See also 
Kevin Sheppard

Further reading 
 Bahrampour, Tara. "An Unlikely U.S. Diplomat Scores with Iranian Fans." The Washington Post. Dec. 23, 2011.
 Chiou, Pauline. "U.S. athlete scores with Iranian fans." Video interview. CNN World Report. CNN International. Jan. 5, 2012.
 "Film on U.S. athlete in Iran." Video. CNN World Sports. CNN International. Jan. 4, 2012.
 Khorram, Yasmin. "Understanding Iran: U.S. athlete reveals his inside story." CNN World Sports. CNN International. Dec. 23, 2011.
 Schartoff, Adam. "The Iran Job & Tips for Managing a Viral Fundraising Campaign." P.O.V. (PBS). Jan. 10, 2012.
 Schoenbrun, Dan. "Kickstarter: Sara Nodjoumi and Till Schauder's 'The Iran Job.'" Filmmaker Magazine (IFP). Jan. 3, 2012.
 Shahryar, Josh. "'The Iran Job': He Got Game, Shiraz-Style." Tehran Bureau (PBS FRONTLINE). Jan. 6, 2012.
 Stambler, Deborah. "Kickstarter Case Study: The Iran Job." The Huffington Post. Nov. 30, 2011.

References

External links 
 
 The Iran Job on Kickstarter

Documentary films about basketball
2012 films
Documentary films about Iran
Kickstarter-funded documentaries